The 2001 Temple Owls football team represented Temple University in the college 2001 NCAA Division I-A football season. Temple competed as a member of the Big East Conference.  The team was coached by Bobby Wallace and played their home games at Veterans Stadium and Franklin Field.

Schedule

References

Temple
Temple Owls football seasons
Temple Owls football